Harry L. Lawrence (c. 1909 – February 20, 1987) was an American football coach. He served as the head football coach at Bucknell University from 1947 to 1957, compiling a record of 45–51–1. Lawrence began his coaching career in 1934 at Baltimore City College, a high school in Baltimore, Maryland. He was head football coach at Baltimore City College from 1934 to 1941 and again in 1946, tallying a mark of 69–10–6. During World War II, he served an officer in the United States Navy with the Atlantic Fleet in the Caribbean, reaching the rank of lieutenant commander. Lawrence attended Baltimore Polytechnic Institute, where he starred in football. He then moved on to Western Maryland College—now known as McDaniel College, playing football as a halfback under head coach Dick Harlow. At Western Maryland, he also competing in basketball, baseball, lacrosse, and rifle. Lawrence resigned from his post at Bucknell in early 1958 to return to Baltimore City College as a guidance counselor. He died at the age of 78, on February 20, 1987, at St. Joseph Hospital in Towson, Maryland.

Head coaching record

College

References

Year of birth missing
1900s births
1987 deaths
American football halfbacks
Bucknell Bison football coaches
McDaniel Green Terror baseball players
McDaniel Green Terror football players
McDaniel Green Terror men's basketball players
McDaniel Green Terror men's lacrosse players
College rifle shooters in the United States
High school football coaches in Maryland
Baltimore Polytechnic Institute alumni
United States Navy officers
United States Navy personnel of World War II
Players of American football from Baltimore
Coaches of American football from Maryland